Ivaylo Mihaylov may refer to:
 Ivaylo Mihaylov (footballer, born 1991)
 Ivaylo Mihaylov (footballer, born 2000)